Viktor Petrovich Savinykh (born 7 March 1940) is a Soviet cosmonaut. Selected as a cosmonaut on 1 December 1978, he flew as Flight Engineer on Soyuz T-4, Soyuz T-13 and Soyuz TM-5, and has spent 252 days 17 hours 38 minutes in space. Savinykh retired on 9 February 1989.

Savinykh was born in Berezkiny, Kirov Oblast, Russian SFSR on 7 March 1940. He is married with one child.

Viktor Savinykh is the author of the book Notes from a Dead Station (Савиных В. П. Записки с мертвой станции. — М.: ИД «Системы Алиса», 1999. - 88 c.) (ISBN 5-901135-01-6). (The book is dedicated to the restoration of control in 1985 over the Salyut 7 space orbital station).

Honours and awards
Twice Hero of the Soviet Union (26 May 1981 and 20 December 1985)
Pilot-Cosmonaut of the USSR
Hero of the Mongolian People's Republic
Hero of the People's Republic of Bulgaria
Order For Merit to the Fatherland
1st class (27 February 2020)
2nd class (6 March 2000) - for outstanding achievements in scientific research and a great contribution to the preparation of highly qualified personnel
3rd class (11 November 1994) - a great service to the people associated with the development of Russian statehood, the achievements in labor, science, culture, arts, strengthening friendship and cooperation between peoples
4th class (12 December 2010) - for services to education, science and a great contribution to the training of qualified specialists
Order of Honour (2 November 2004) - for services to the development of education and many years of diligent work
Three Orders of Lenin
Medal "For Merit in Space Exploration" (12 April 2011) - for the great achievements in the field of research, development and utilization of outer space, many years of diligent work, public activities
Jubilee Medal "300 Years of the Russian Navy"
Medal "In Commemoration of the 850th Anniversary of Moscow"
State Prize of the Russian Federation for science and technology (18 June 1996)
State Prize of the USSR (1989)
Order of Stara Planina (People's Republic of Bulgaria; 9 June 2003)
Order of Georgi Dimitrov People's Republic of Bulgaria)
Order of Sukhbaatar (Mongolian People's Republic)
Order of Military Glory of the Syrian Arab Republic (UAR, 1987)
Two of the Order of "Friendship" (ATS, 1999, 2000)
Award of the President of the Russian Federation in the field of education for 2002 (5 October 2003)
Honored Master of Sports of the USSR (1981)
Gold medal of the Tsiolkovsky Academy of Sciences of the USSR (1986) - for outstanding contribution to space exploration

In 2007, a monument at the Tsiolkovsky, Air and Space Museum, Kirov.

Honorary citizen of Kaluga, Perm, Kirov, Dzhezkazgan (Kazakhstan), Ulaanbaatar, Darkhan (Mongolia)

Honorary Citizen of the Kirov region.

In 2005, minor planet 6890, was named after Savinykh.

References

External links
http://www.collectspace.com/collection/autographs-savinykh.html
http://www.astronautix.com/astros/savinykh.htm

1940 births
Living people
People from Orichevsky District
Soviet cosmonauts
Corresponding Members of the Russian Academy of Sciences
Heroes of the Soviet Union
Heroes of the People's Republic of Bulgaria
Full Cavaliers of the Order "For Merit to the Fatherland"
Recipients of the Order of Honour (Russia)
Recipients of the Order of Lenin
State Prize of the Russian Federation laureates
Recipients of the USSR State Prize
Recipients of the Order of Georgi Dimitrov
Recipients of the Medal "For Merit in Space Exploration"
Salyut program cosmonauts
Spacewalkers
Mir crew members